Isognathus excelsior is a moth of the  family Sphingidae.

Distribution 
It is known from Colombia, Venezuela and Ecuador to north-western Brazil.

Description 
It can be distinguished from all other Isognathus species by the pure white underside to the abdomen with conspicuous paired black spots on each segment.

Biology 
There are probably multiple generations per year.

The larvae probably feed on Apocynaceae species. They have long tails and are very colourful, suggesting they are unpalatable to birds.

References

Isognathus
Moths described in 1875